Clement House or Clements House may refer to:

United Kingdom
 LSE Clement House

United States

Wilson-Clements House, Northport, Alabama, listed on the NRHP in Tuscaloosa County, Alabama
Clements Rowhouse, Denver, Colorado, listed on the NRHP in downtown Denver, Colorado
House at 7144 Madrid Avenue, Jacksonville, Florida, also known as the Clements House, NRHP-listed
Le Vega Clements House, Owensboro, Kentucky, listed on the NRHP in Daviess County, Kentucky
Clements House (Springfield, Kentucky), listed on the NRHP in Washington County, Kentucky
Henry Clements House, Lansing, Michigan, Michigan historic site in Eaton County, Michigan
C.C. Clement House, Fergus Falls, Minnesota, listed on the NRHP in Otter Tail County, Minnesota
Clement House (Buffalo, New York), contributing property to the NRHP listed Delaware Avenue Historic District
Jesse Clement House, Mocksville, North Carolina, listed on the NRHP in Davie County, North Carolina
George S. Clement House, Wauseon, Ohio, NRHP-listed
Clement-Nagel House, Cuero, Texas, listed on the NRHP in DeWitt County, Texas
Clementwood, Rutland, Vermont, listed on the NRHP in Rutland County, Vermont
Proctor-Clement House, Rutland, Vermont, listed on the NRHP in Rutland County, Vermont

See also
Clements Café, Dublin, Ireland
Clements Hall, Dallas, Texas, listed on the NRHP in Dallas County, Texas
Clements State Bank Building, Clements, Minnesota, listed on the NRHP in Redwood County, Minnesota
James Clements Airport Administration Building, Bay City, Michigan, NRHP-listed